The Romanian Hearth Union or Romanian Hearth Federation is a far-right nationalist movement and civic organization, founded in Târgu Mureș in 1990.

The main purpose of the organization is to save Romanians "hunted down in their own country" from the Hungarians viewed as "hordes plaguing humanity". The emergence of the "Romanian Hearth" was helped by ex-Securitate officers. The organization has been described by various sources as quasi-fascist, radical nationalist, xenophobic ultra-nationalist, anti-Hungarian and anti-Semitic. It was associated with the former political party of Romanian National Unity Party (PUNR).

See also
 Ethnic clashes of Târgu Mureș

References

Romanian nationalism
Far-right politics in Europe
Anti-Hungarian sentiment in Romania
Antisemitism in Romania